The Supreme Council of the Republic of Latvia (Latvian: Latvijas Republikas Augstākā Padome) was the transitional parliament of Latvia from 1990 to 1993, after the restoration of independence. The Supreme Council was elected on  1990 as the Supreme Soviet of the Latvian SSR. On  1990 it declared the restoration of independence of Latvia and began a transitional period which lasted until the first session of the fifth Saeima on  1993. Independence was fully restored on  1991 during the Soviet coup attempt.

Chairman of the Supreme Council of the Republic of Latvia

Anatolijs Gorbunovs , 1990 – , 1993

See also
 The Barricades, the last confrontation between Soviet forces against Latvian nationals
 1991 Soviet Union referendum, where Latvians voted in favor of a new, independent republic
 1993 Latvian parliamentary election

References 

Defunct unicameral legislatures
Political history of Latvia